The Beths are a New Zealand indie rock band, formed in Auckland in 2014. The group principally consists of lead vocalist Elizabeth Stokes, guitarist Jonathan Pearce, bassist Benjamin Sinclair, and drummer Tristan Deck. Meeting at the University of Auckland, the band signed to Carpark Records in 2018, where they have released the albums Future Me Hates Me (2018), Jump Rope Gazers (2020), and Expert in a Dying Field (2022). They have toured internationally with Death Cab for Cutie and received praise from Rolling Stone and Pitchfork.

History
Elizabeth Stokes and Jonathan Pearce originally met in high school, and they met both Benjamin Sinclair and Ivan Luketina-Johnston when all four attended classes at the University of Auckland, studying jazz. Prior to The Beths, Luketina-Johnston was performing swing under the moniker of Sal Valentine. Stokes, Pearce and Sinclair were all a part of his backing band, The Babyshakes, for various tenures.

The Beths were formed in late 2014 and released their first single "Idea/Intent" via SoundCloud in July 2015. Stokes said that she named the band using her own name, after being inspired by Gilmore Girls character Lorelai Gilmore naming her daughter after herself. In March 2016, the band independently released their debut EP, Warm Blood. The EP spawned a single, "Whatever," which was released with an accompanying music video in May 2016.

The Beths have received financial support from the NZ on Air and NZ Music Commission. In September 2015, the band received money to make the single and video for "Whatever" from NZ on Air. In May 2016, NZ on Air funded a video for "Lying in the Sun". Through their Outward Sound program, the NZ Music Commission funded three tours as part of their international music market development grants.

A new single, "Great No One," was released in October 2017. The song was the first to be lifted from the band's debut album, Future Me Hates Me. Prior to the album's release in 2018, the band announced their signing to Carpark Records in the US (who also reissued Warm Blood internationally) and to Dew Process in Australia. The album was released globally on 10 August 2018, followed by an international tour supporting the release. The title track was nominated as one of five finalists for the 2018 Silver Scroll award in New Zealand.

In 2018, Luketina-Johnston permanently departed from the band to focus on Sal Valentine.

In November 2018, the band announced the forthcoming release of a new seven-inch, Have Yourself a Merry Little Christmas. The vinyl features the band's cover of the traditional title track, as well as a demo version of their song "Happy Unhappy." "Happy Unhappy" was named 2018 Rolling Stone magazine song of the summer.

In early 2019, the band undertook a tour of the UK and Europe supporting Death Cab for Cutie.

Their second studio album Jump Rope Gazers was released in July 2020.

On June 13, 2022, the single "Silence Is Golden" was released with the announcement of their third album, Expert In A Dying Field, which was released on September 16, 2022.

Musical style 
The band is known for its use of vocal harmony, using the voices of all four band members. Members of the band have cited Alvvays and Bully as inspirations for their work.

Band members

Current members 
 Elizabeth Stokes – lead vocals, rhythm guitar (2014–present)
 Jonathan Pearce – lead guitar, backing vocals (2014–present)
 Benjamin Sinclair – bass, backing vocals (2014–2018, 2018–present)
 Tristan Deck – drums, backing vocals, percussion (2019–present; touring member 2018–2019)

Former members 
 Ivan Luketina-Johnston – drums, backing vocals, percussion (2014–2018)

Former touring musicians 
 Katie Everingham – drums, backing vocals (2018)
 Chris Pearce – bass, backing vocals (2018)
 Adam Tobeck – drums, backing vocals, percussion (2018)

Discography

Albums

Studio albums

Live albums

Extended plays

Singles

Guest appearances

Music videos

References

External links

 
 The Beths at Carpark Records

2015 establishments in New Zealand
New Zealand indie rock groups
Musical groups established in 2015
Musical groups from Auckland
Dew Process artists
Carpark Records artists